CMA CGM Medea is a container ship built in 2006.

Design 
CMA CGM Medea was built in 2006 in the ship-yard of Hyundai Heavy Industries. The ship has a deadweight tonnage of 113,909 metric tons and a gross tonnage of 107,711 gross tons. The net tonnage of CMA CGM Medea is 50,109 net tons. The vessel has a capacity for 9,415 TEU, according to company calculations.

Engine equipment 
The main engine installed on board of CMA CGM Medea is a Man B&W 12K98MC. This produces a cruising speed of 23.2 knots, with a maximum speed of 25.4 knots.  In addition the ship has two bow thrusters with power of 2,500 kW each, for added manoeuvrability in ports.

Bridge equipment 
The bridge equipment consists of GPS, dGPS, Automatic Identification System (AIS) and Automatic Radar Plotting Aid (ARPA), which usually allows the position of the ship to be plotted with an accuracy of 100 meters.  The Electronic chart system - ECDIS plots the ship's position against charts automatically. The information from the AIS, ARPA and Radar is used to allow the bridge crew to accurately plot the positions of other ships in the vicinity.

See also 
 Emma Mærsk
 Hannover Bridge
 NYK Vega

References

External links

CMA CGM S.A.

Container ships
Merchant ships of Panama
2006 ships
Ships built by Hyundai Heavy Industries Group
Medea